Plounéour-Ménez is a commune in the Finistère department of Brittany in north-western France.

Population
Inhabitants of Plounéour-Ménez are called in French Énéouriens.

See also
Communes of the Finistère department
Parc naturel régional d'Armorique
Plounéour-Ménez Parish close
Roc'h Trevezel, the second peak of the Breton part of the Armorican Massif in the Monts d'Arrée, located in the commune
Roland Doré sculptor, sculpture in local church

References

External links

Mayors of Finistère Association 

Communes of Finistère